The Iod is a left tributary of the river Mureș in Transylvania, Romania. It discharges into the Mureș in the village Iod.

References

Rivers of Romania
Rivers of Mureș County